The 1907 European Figure Skating Championships were held on January 26 and 27 in Berlin, German Empire. Elite figure skaters competed for the title of European Champion in the category of men's singles.

Results

Men

Judges:
 I. Fossling 
 O. Henning 
 Georg Helfrich  and 
 Otto Schöning 
 A. Prokesch

References

Sources
 Result List provided by the ISU

European Figure Skating Championships, 1907
European Figure Skating Championships
European 1907
European Figure Skating Championships, 1907
1907 in German sport
1900s in Berlin
January 1907 sports events
Sports competitions in Berlin